The following lists events that have happened in 2016 in the Italian Republic.

Incumbents
 President: Sergio Mattarella 
 Prime Minister: Matteo Renzi (until 12 December), Paolo Gentiloni (starting 12 December)

Events

January
4 January : the car manufacturer Ferrari enters the Milan Stock Exchange in Piazza Affari with its own share.
 9 January: Murder of Ashley Ann Olsen in Florence
21-24 January: 2015–16 Biathlon World Cup – World Cup 6 in Rasen-Antholz

February  
 3 February: the murder of Giulio Regeni, an Italian researcher kidnapped on the previous 25 January, is discovered in Egypt

April
2 April - 12 September - Triennial 2016
4-10 April - 2016 IIHF Women's World Championship Division I Group B in Asiago

May
6-29 May: 2016 Giro d'Italia
 20 May: the Cirinnà law for same-sex civil unions is approved.

June  
1 June: inauguration of the Gotthard Base Tunnel, the longest high-speed rail tunnel in the world.
2 June: 70th anniversary of the Italian Republic.

July 
12 July - Andria-Corato train collision

August
 21 August: Olympic Italy concludes the Rio Olympics, totaling 28 medals. 
24 August: August 2016 Central Italy earthquake

October  
26 October: earthquake measuring 5.9 on the Richter scale in Central Italy with its epicenter between Castelsantangelo sul Nera, Visso and Ussita.
30 October: Earthquake measuring 6.5 on the Richter scale in Central Italy with its epicenter between Norcia and Preci.

December  
7 December: Prime Minister Matteo Renzi resigns in the hands of the President of the Republic Sergio Mattarella following the defeat in the referendum on 4 December.
 12 December: Paolo Gentiloni assumes the office of President of the Council of Ministers.
22 December: the Salerno-Reggio Calabria motorway is completed and renamed the Mediterranean motorway.

Deaths
January 7 – Valerio Zanone, 79, politician 
January 14 – Franco Citti, 80, actor
January 19 – Ettore Scola, 84, director
February 19 – Umberto Eco, 82, philosopher and semiotician
March 25 – Paolo Poli, 86, theatre actor
May 19 – Marco Pannella, 86, politician 
May 28 – Giorgio Albertazzi, 92, actor and director
June 5 – Gianluca Buonanno, 50, politician 
June 27 – Bud Spencer, 86, actor
July 13 – Bernardo Provenzano, 83, criminal and chief of the Sicilian Mafia
September 16 – Carlo Azeglio Ciampi, 95,  former President
October 13 – Dario Fo, 90, actor and Nobel Prize laureate
November 1 – Tina Anselmi, 89, politician 
November 8 – Umberto Veronesi, 90, scientist

See also
 2016 in Italian television
 List of Italian films of 2016

References

 
2010s in Italy
Years of the 21st century in Italy
Italy
Italy